Callum Tapping (born 5 June 1993) is a Scottish professional footballer, who plays for Edinburgh City as a midfielder.

Tapping has previously played for Hearts, Queen of the South, Brechin City, Forfar Athletic and Stenhousemuir as well as Alloa Athletic on loan. Tapping has also represented Scotland at Under-19 and Under-21 level.

Background
Born in London to an English father and a Scottish mother, Tapping moved to Scotland at 6 years old and attended Larbert High School in Stenhousemuir. He is the elder brother of Jordan Tapping who also plays football in the Scottish League set up.

Club career

Early career
Tapping played at youth level for Celtic and Hamilton Academical before signing for Tottenham Hotspur in June 2009, where he initially played for their under-18 team with 8 appearances. Tapping was then rewarded with his first professional contract at the White Hart Lane club in June 2010 and was promoted to their Premier Reserve League squad, with 27 appearances during that season at the Reserve League level.

Heart of Midlothian

On 31 August 2011, Tapping joined Hearts on a two-year contract with an option for a further year and initially joined up with the Tynecastle club's Under-19 squad. Prior to signing for Hearts, Tapping had played as a trialist for the club during the Keyline Challenge Cup Tournament in Oban earlier that year.

Loan to Alloa Athletic 
In November 2012, Tapping joined Alloa Athletic on a one-month loan deal to gain first-team experience. Tapping made his senior football debut on 17 November 2012 as a 67th-minute substitute in a home league match versus Brechin City. Alloa were keen to extend his loan spell, although Tapping returned to Hearts after making only 4 appearances for the Clackmannanshire club.

Tapping made his Hearts first-team debut on 19 January 2013 as a 71st-minute substitute for Dylan McGowan at Celtic Park in a 4-1 SPL defeat versus Celtic. Tapping made his first start for Hearts the following week in the Scottish League Cup semi final win against Inverness Caledonian Thistle. Tapping was released by Hearts at the end of the 2013–14 season.

Brechin City
Tapping then signed for the Angus club Brechin City at the start of the 2014–15 season, where he played in 13 league matches.

Queen of the South

Tapping then signed for Queen of the South for the start of the 2015–16 season. Tapping was injured for seven months of his first season with the Dumfries club and was then out injured once again for eight months of the 2016–17 season. Tapping played in 32 league matches for the club. The Dumfries club announced his departure on 5 January 2018. Manager Gary Naysmith said, "Callum was a popular lad around the dressing room and a model professional. I am pleased to say that he never missed a days training this season since he returned from his knee injury at the tail end of last season and I would personally like to thank him for all that he has done for Queen of the South and hope that he stays injury free and enjoys his time at Brechin and beyond".

Brechin City (2nd spell)

On 4 January 2018, Tapping re-joined Brechin City. He immediately become a first team regular starting all 17 remaining league games of that season after he joined. He debuted in this spell on 6 January 2018, in the 1–1 home draw v Morton. As at Christmas Day of season 2017/18 Tapping had made 21 appearances in the league, Scottish Cup and League Cup scoring four goals.

Forfar Athletic 
On 3 June 2019, Tapping signed a one-year contract with Forfar Athletic.

Stenhousemuir 
On 3 August 2020, Stenhousemuir announced the signing of Tapping after his contract with Forfar came to an end.

International career
Tapping was called up to the Scotland under-19 squad and debuted on 10 May 2011 versus Denmark and gained 3 caps in total.

Tapping debuted for the Scotland under-21s on 6 February 2013 versus Greece and this was his only appearance at this level.

References

External links

1993 births
Living people
Footballers from Greater London
Footballers from Falkirk (council area)
Scottish footballers
Scotland youth international footballers
Celtic F.C. players
Hamilton Academical F.C. players
Tottenham Hotspur F.C. players
Heart of Midlothian F.C. players
Alloa Athletic F.C. players
Scottish Premier League players
Scottish Football League players
Scottish Professional Football League players
Scotland under-21 international footballers
Brechin City F.C. players
Queen of the South F.C. players
Association football midfielders
Stenhousemuir F.C. players